Pontook Reservoir is a  impoundment on the Androscoggin River in Coos County in northern New Hampshire, United States. The dam and impoundment are located in the town of Dummer. The reservoir was created for hydroelectric power generation.

See also

List of lakes in New Hampshire

References

Lakes of Coös County, New Hampshire
Reservoirs in New Hampshire
Protected areas of Coös County, New Hampshire
Northern Forest Canoe Trail
Androscoggin River